MacLife (stylized as Mac|Life) is an American monthly magazine published by Future US. It focuses on the Macintosh personal computer and related products, including the iPad and iPhone. It’s sold as a print product on newsstands, and an interactive and animated app edition through the App Store.
Between September 1996 and February 2007, the magazine was known as MacAddict.

History
MacLife is one of two successor magazines to the defunct CD-ROM Today. First published in 1993 by Imagine Publishing (now Future US), CD-ROM Today was targeted at both Windows and Macintosh users, and each issue shipped with a CD-ROM of shareware and demo programs. In August 1996, CD-ROM Today ceased publication, with two magazines taking its place: MacAddict for Macintosh users, and boot (now Maximum PC) for Windows users.

As was the case with CD-ROM Today, MacAddict'''s discs included shareware and demo programs, but also came with other added features, such as staff videos and previews of content inside the magazine's hard copy. The MacAddict website was updated daily with news relevant to Apple products. MacAddict also had a mascot, a stick-figure named Max. By 1998, MacAddict surpassed Macworld as the Macintosh magazine with the highest consumer newsstand spending due to its $7.99 cover price.

In February 2007, MacAddict was relaunched as MacLife. The new magazine is physically larger than the old magazine and was focused on the creativity of Mac users, and no longer comes with a CD-ROM.

In Germany, a magazine of the same name but with no association is published by Falkemedia from Kiel.

Reviewing system
From 1996 to mid-2002, there were four rating icons, which depicted Max. There was "Blech" (the lowest), "Yeah, Whatever" (a mediocre product), "Spiffy" (a solid yet not perfect product), and "Freakin' Awesome" (the highest). From 2002 to 2009, it was replaced with a more conventional five-point system. Then, in 2010, MacLife'' adopted a 10-point system that included half stars.

References

External links
 – official site
Archived MacAddict magazines on the Internet Archive 

Computer magazines published in the United States
Monthly magazines published in the United States
Macintosh magazines
Macintosh websites
Magazines established in 1996
Magazines published in the San Francisco Bay Area